Paperity is a multidisciplinary aggregator of open access journals and papers. It was launched in October 2014 with 160,000 articles.

As of December 2020, Paperity includes 7.2 million articles from 15,300 journals, covering all academic disciplines: mathematical sciences, life sciences, medicine, social sciences, humanities, arts. Paperity provides full-text search, RSS feeds and a mobile application to access the literature. All articles are available in full text without fees.

Paperity shares the aggregated metadata with other academic services such as OCLC.

References

External links
 Official website

Bibliographic databases and indexes
Full-text scholarly online databases
Aggregation-based digital libraries
Polish digital libraries
Scholarly search services
Open access projects
Open-access archives
Online databases